Edge Hill is an escarpment and Edgehill a hamlet in the civil parish of Ratley and Upton, Stratford-on-Avon District, southern Warwickshire, England.

Edge Hill gave its name to the first battle of the English Civil War, in which it was a prominent feature.

The hamlet has a public house, an eccentric building of local Hornton Stone called the Castle Inn that was built in the 1740s to the designs of Sanderson Miller (1716–80). It is controlled by the Hook Norton Brewery.

Battle

The narrow wood on the scarp of Edge Hill, in the south-east overlooks the lower slope and the plain on which the battle was fought.

The battle of Edge Hill was fought on Sunday 23 October 1642 and was the first major battle in the English Civil War between the Royalist forces of King Charles I and the Parliamentarian army commanded by the Earl of Essex.

From Edge Hill, the ground drops steeply, levels out, then rises to Battleton Holt and a little beyond it are the Oaks and Graveground Copice. It was across the latter two that Parliament's army was drawn up ( to ). The King's forces descended from the escarpment and faced them, extended between the end of the spur at Knowle End and Brixfield Farm ( to ). The King's army had to descend from the edge of the escarpment if they wished to engage the Parliamentarians in battle, because the escarpment was far too steep for Essex to consider an attack against the Royalist army while it was on the edge. At the time of the battle, there were far fewer trees. The battle was inconclusive, with both sides claiming victory. It would take several more years and many more battles before the Parliamentarians won the war.

In 1643, following reports of ghostly sightings published by a printer Thomas Jackson, the King sent a Royal commission to visit the site, where they claimed to have seen two phantom armies fighting in the sky above them.

Quarrying
The area around Edge Hill has been quarried extensively for Jurassic ironstone since the 11th century. Later iron ore was quarried and transported on the Edge Hill Light Railway to the Stratford-upon-Avon and Midland Junction Railway near Burton Dassett.

References

Sources

External links

 BattleOfEdgehill.org - Dedicated website
 Battlefields Trust: Edge Hill

Villages in Warwickshire
Hills of Warwickshire
Reportedly haunted locations in West Midlands (region)
Stratford-on-Avon District